HMS Anglesea (referred to as HMS Anglesey on occasion) was a 50-gun fourth rate ship of the line of the Royal Navy, launched at Plymouth Dockyard in 1694.

Anglesea was one of four ships sent to Madagascar on an anti-piracy mission under Thomas Warren in 1699.

Anglesea was reduced to a fifth rate in 1719, and underwent a rebuild in 1725.

Notes

References

Lavery, Brian (2003) The Ship of the Line - Volume 1: The development of the battlefleet 1650-1850. Conway Maritime Press. .

Ships of the line of the Royal Navy
1690s ships
Ships involved in anti-piracy efforts